Sympistis greyi is a moth of the family Noctuidae first described by James T. Troubridge and Lars G. Crabo in 1998. It is found in western North America from British Columbia, south through central Washington and central Oregon.

The species is named for L. Paul Grey.

The wingspan is about 30 mm. The length of the forewings is 12–14 mm.

References

External links
Technical description: "New Oncocnemis (Lepidoptera: Noctuidae) from the Pacific Northwest".

greyi
Moths of North America
Moths described in 1998